Mian Fida Hussain Wattoo is a Pakistani politician who is a Member of the Provincial Assembly of the Punjab, from August 2018 till May 2022 and from July 2022 to January 2023. He has been Member of the Provincial Assembly of the Punjab, from June 2008 to May 2018.

Early life
He was born on 1 January 1960 in Bahawalnagar.

Political career
He was elected to the Provincial Assembly of the Punjab as a candidate for Pakistan Muslim League (N) (PML-N) for Constituency PP-277 (Bahawalnagar-I) in by-polls held in June 2008. He received 32,706 votes.

He was re-elected to the Provincial Assembly of the Punjab  as a candidate for PML-N for Constituency PP-277 (Bahawalnagar-I) in 2013 Pakistani general election.

In December 2013, he was appointed as Parliamentary Secretary for forestry, wildlife.

He was re-elected to Provincial Assembly of the Punjab as an independent candidate from Constituency PP-237 (Bahawalnagar-I) in 2018 Pakistani general election.

He joined Pakistan Tehreek-e-Insaf (PTI) following 2018 election. He de-seated due to vote against party policy for Chief Minister of Punjab election  on 16 April 2022.

He was re-elected on July 17, 2022 as a Member of Provincial Assembly of Punjab from Constituency PP-237.

References

Living people
Punjab MPAs 2013–2018
1960 births
Pakistan Muslim League (N) politicians
Punjab MPAs 2008–2013
Pakistan Tehreek-e-Insaf MPAs (Punjab)
Punjab MPAs 2018–2023